The grey dagger (Acronicta psi) is a moth of the family Noctuidae.

Distribution
This species can be found from Europe and North Africa to northern Iran, central Asia, southern and central Siberia and Mongolia. In the Levant it is found in Lebanon and Israel.

Habitat

Description
These moths have grey forewings with bold black dagger-shaped markings. (The Latin specific name also refers to these markings, as resembling the Greek letter , .) The hindwings are dirty grey, generally paler in the male.

The moth is very similar to the dark dagger (Acronicta tridens) and identification is generally only possible by minute examination of the genitalia. See Townsend et al. However, in general this moth is generally darker in colour than the dark dagger and always lacks the white hindwings often present in the male of that species. Moreover, the larvae of the two species are very different.

The larva of Acronicta psi is quite hairy, greyish or brownish below and black above, with red spots along the sides and a bold yellow stripe along the back. It has a distinctive horn just behind the head (absent from the larva of dark dagger).

Biology
The grey dagger flies at night from June to August and is attracted to light and sometimes to sugar.

It feeds on a wide range of plants, mainly trees and shrubs (see list below). The species overwinters as a pupa.

Food plants
Recorded food plants include:

Acer platanoides – Norway maple
Aegopodium podagraria – ground-elder
Alnus glutinosa, Alnus incana – alder
Amelanchier spicata
Betula verrucosa, Betula pubescens – birch
Corylus avellana – hazel
Cotoneaster
Crataegus oxyacantha, Crataegus coccinea – hawthornMalus domestica – applePhotinia – red robinPopulus tremula, Populus suaveolens – poplarPrunus domestica, Prunus cerasus, Prunus avium, Prunus padusPyrus communis – pearQuercus robur – oakRosa – roseRubus idaeus – brambleSalix caprea, Salix phylicifolia – willowSorbus intermedia, Sorbus hybrida, Sorbus aucupariaSpiraea salicifoliaTilia – limeUlmus glabra – elm

Gallery

Notes

 References 

Bibliography
Chinery, Michael Collins Guide to the Insects of Britain and Western Europe 1986 (Reprinted 1991)
Skinner, Bernard Colour Identification Guide to Moths of the British Isles'' 1984

External links

Lepiforum.de 
 Paolo Mazzei, Diego Reggianti, Ilaria Pimpinelli Moths and Butterflies of Europe and North Africa
 Svenska fjärila 

Acronicta
Moths described in 1758
Moths of Africa
Moths of Asia
Moths of Europe
Taxa named by Carl Linnaeus